2613 Plzeň, provisional designation , is an asteroid from the outer region of the asteroid belt, approximately 28 kilometers in diameter. It was discovered on 30 August 1979, by Czech astronomer Ladislav Brožek at the South Bohemian Kleť Observatory in the Czech Republic. It was later named for the Czech city of Plzeň.

Orbit and classification 

Plzeň orbits the Sun in the outer main-belt at a distance of 2.9–3.2 AU once every 5 years and 4 months (1,937 days). Its orbit has an eccentricity of 0.05 and an inclination of 13° with respect to the ecliptic. However, Plzeňs observation arc begins with its discovery observation in 1979, as its first identification remained unused.

Physical characteristics 

According to three observations made by the Infrared Astronomical Satellite IRAS and based on observations made by NASA's Wide-field Infrared Survey Explorer with its subsequent NEOWISE mission, the asteroid measures 28.0 and 28.2 kilometers in diameter and its surface has an albedo of 0.074 and 0.077, which is a typical albedo carbonaceous asteroids. Based on its absolute magnitude of 11.4, its mean-diameter is between 13 and 32 kilometers, assuming an albedo in the range of 0.05 to 0.25, which covers both stony and carbonaceous types.

As of 2016, Plzeňs spectral type, surface composition, rotation period and shape remain unknown.

Naming 

This minor planet was named in honour of the Czech city of Plzeň, internationally better known as "Pilsen", birthplace of the discoverer, industrial and cultural center of West Bohemia, and known worldwide for its Pilsner beer. The official naming citation was published on 28 January 1983.

References

External links 
 Klet Observatory website – 2613 Plzeň
 Asteroid Lightcurve Database (LCDB), query form (info )
 Dictionary of Minor Planet Names, Google books
 Asteroids and comets rotation curves, CdR – Observatoire de Genève, Raoul Behrend
 Discovery Circumstances: Numbered Minor Planets (1)-(5000) – Minor Planet Center
 
 

002613
Discoveries by Ladislav Brožek
Named minor planets
19790830